Luis Miguel Ramírez Romero (born 29 September 1969) is a Mexican politician affiliated with the PAN. As of 2013 he served as Deputy of the LXII Legislature of the Mexican Congress representing Morelos.

References

1969 births
Living people
People from Cuernavaca
National Action Party (Mexico) politicians
21st-century Mexican politicians
Members of the Congress of Morelos
Politicians from Morelos
Deputies of the LXII Legislature of Mexico
Members of the Chamber of Deputies (Mexico) for Morelos